Heart & Soul is a 2020 medical TV series about how ailment can be treated physically alongside spiritual. It was produced, written, and directed by Obi Emelonye.

Cast 

 Chioma Adibe as Matron

 Ademola Amoo as Dr Sydney

 Odun Ayo as Mary

 Phoenix Ezendu as Udoka

 Anthony Monjaro as Dr Aloysius

 Joy Nmezi as Miriam

 Ifeanyi Onehuba as Lyk

 Femi Onasoga as Jude

 Ijeoma Richards as Dr Regina

Plot 
A medical doctor who just got back from the UK to treat patients which require spiritual intervention as well.

References 

2020 Nigerian television series debuts
Works by Obi Emelonye
English-language television shows
Africa Magic original programming